The Ambassador from Israel to the Philippines is Israel's foremost diplomatic representative in the Philippines.

List of ambassadors
 1957: Minister Jacob Shimoni (Non-Resident)
 1957–1960: Minister Daniel Lewin (diplomat) (Non-Resident, Naypyitaw) 
 1960–1963: Minister Yehiel Ilsar
 1963–1965: Ambassador Shmuel Shelef
 1965–1968: Avraham Kidron
 1968–1972: Yaacov Avnon
 1972–1976: Daniel Laor
 1976–1978: Shlomo Seruya 
 1978–1981: Moshe Raviv
 1981–1983: Jacob Aviad 
 1983–1986: Uri Gordon
 1986–1988: Meir Gavish
 1988–1992: Yoav Behiri 
 1992–1997: Amos Shetibel
 1997–2000: Ilan Baruch
 2000–2004: Irit Ben-Abba 
 2004–2007: Yehosua Sagi
 2007–2011: Zvi Aviner-Vapni
 2011–2014: Menashe Bar-On 
 2014–2018: Ephraim Ben-Matityahu 
 2018–2021: Rafael Harpaz
 2021–present: Ilan Fluss

References

External links
 Official website of the Israeli Embassy, Manila

Philippines
Israel